James "Jim" Tolson (born 26 May 1965) is a Scottish Liberal Democrat politician, and a former Member of the Scottish Parliament (MSP) for Dunfermline West from 2007 until 2011.

Prior to his election as an MSP, he was a Fife councillor and employee of Sky Subscriber Services Ltd in Dunfermline. In 2005, Tolson won a case against Sky at an employment tribunal seeking more time off to carry out council duties.

Tolson's seat was abolished in the 2011 Scottish Parliament election and he contested the new Dunfermline constituency but lost to the Scottish National Party's Bill Walker.

References

External links
 
 Jim Tolson profile at the Scottish Liberal Democrats web site

1965 births
Living people
Liberal Democrat MSPs
Members of the Scottish Parliament 2007–2011
Scottish Liberal Democrat councillors
Councillors in Fife